Ferenc Szabó (28 February 1921 in Alsóújlak, Hungary – 12 March 2009 in Budapest) was a Hungarian football player who played as a defender and striker for Ferencváros TC.

Football career

Club career
Between 1946 and 1952, he played a total of 199 games for Ferencváros TC (144 league games, 37 international, 18 domestic matches) and scored 49 goals (25 league, 24 other). In the 1948-49 season, he was a member of the championship team.

International career
In 1948, he once was featured on the Hungarian national team.

Honours
 Magyar bajnokság
 bajnok: 1948–49
 2.: 1949–50
 3.: 1947–48

Statistics

Matches for the national team 
 Albania 0–0 Hungary, 23 May 1948

References

Further reading 
 Ki kicsoda a magyar sportéletben? , III. kötet (S–Z).Szekszárd, Babits Kiadó, 1995, 93. o., 

1921 births
2009 deaths
Ferencvárosi TC footballers
Újpest FC players
Association football forwards
Association football defenders
Hungarian footballers
Hungary international footballers
Sportspeople from Vas County